The York Mountain AVA is an American Viticultural Area located in San Luis Obispo County, California. It is part of the larger Central Coast AVA, located on the eastern side of the Santa Lucia Mountains, west of Paso Robles AVA.  The mountainous AVA region has most vineyards planted at an elevation of about 1,500 feet (457 m).  York Mountain is cooler and wetter than Paso Robles being just  from the Pacific Ocean.  York Mountain gained AVA status in 1984 as a result of a successful petition by the York family who have owned the York Mountain Winery, since its establishment in 1882 by Andrew York, a British immigrant.

Epoch Estate Wines now owns the York Mountain Vineyard and houses their Tasting Room in the historic York Mountain Winery building.

References

External links
 Epoch Estate Wines formerly York Mountain Winery.

American Viticultural Areas of California
Santa Lucia Range
Geography of San Luis Obispo County, California
American Viticultural Areas
1983 establishments in California